Sar Jangal may refer to:
 Sar Jangal, Anbarabad, Kerman Province
 Sar Jangal, Bam, Kerman Province
 Sar Jangal, Rezvan, Jiroft County, Kerman Province
 Sar Jangal, Rudbar-e Jonubi, Kerman Province
 Sar Jangal, Razavi Khorasan
 Sarjangal, Zahedan County, Sistan and Baluchestan Province